Jalan Kajang-Puchong or Jalan Sungai Chua on Kajang town side (Selangor state route B11) is a major road in Selangor, Malaysia.

List of junctions

Roads in Selangor